Katalin Erzsébet Tisza, commonly known as Kata Tisza (born 30 August 1980, Târgu Mureș) is a Hungarian writer. She is descendant of the old noble family Tisza, and a great-great grandchild of former prime minister Kálmán Tisza.

Novels
 Pesti kínálat, 2005. I.A.T. Kiadó, 163 p.
 Hét nap nyár, 2005. Sanoma
 Reváns, 2006. Ulpius-ház könyvkiadó, 167 p.
 Főbűnösök, anthology 2006. Ulpius-ház könyvkiadó, 231 p.
 Magyar pszicho. Alexandra, 221 p.
 Doktor Kleopátra, 2008, Alexandra Kiadó, 216 p.
 ‘’Most. Túlélő leszel, nem áldozat'', 2019, Scolar kiadó, 504p.

References 

1980 births
Living people
People from Târgu Mureș
Hungarian journalists
Hungarian women writers
Hungarian women journalists
Kata